This is a list of notable Greek Armenians.

Greek Armenians are people born, raised, or who reside in Greece, with origins in the area known as Armenian, which ranges from the Caucasian mountain range to the Anatolian plateau.

To be included in this list, the person must have a Wikipedia article showing they are Greek Armenian or must have references showing they are Greek Armenian and are notable.

List

Actors
 Raoul Aslan - actor
 Christina Alexanian - actress
 Giannis Sparidis - actor
 Arto Apartian - actor
 Kostas Intzegian - actor
 Romina Katsikian - actress
 Sophia Alexanian - actress
 Kenzo - adult actor

Art
 Eirini Noune Kazarian - model - gntm winner
 Asadour Baharian - painter 
 Sergey Merkurov - sculptor
 Sero Abrahamian - fashion designer
 Maria Kazarian - TV personality
 Foteini Aristakesyan fosbloque - youtube personality
 Misel Pagosian - entrepreneur - manager
 Maria Markatsian - gntm model
 Anzel Kourtian - survivor of Asia Minor genocide

Journalism
 Arthur Derounian - writer
  Giorgos Krikorian - TV journalist
 Art Antimian - TV reporter
 Gaspar Karapetyan - activist
 Thanos Exarlian - victim of terrorism

Music
 Georges Garvarentz - composer
 Iakovos Kolanian - guitarist
 Marika Ninou - singer
 Derek Sherinian - keyboardist
 Athena Manoukian - singer
 Kiriakos Kianos - singer
 Arda Mandikian - mezzo soprano
 Eva Rivas - singer
 Diana Saakian - singer, actress
 Hovig Demirjian - singer
 Haig Yazdjian - composer
 Naira Alexopoulou - singer
 Crystallia - singer

Politics
 Marios Garoyian - Cypriot politician

Military
 Konstantinos Mazarakis-Ainian - military officer, Macedonian warrior

Religion
 George Gurdjieff - teacher

Royals
 Basil I - Byzantine emperor

Sports
 Artiom Kiouregkian - wrestler
 Oganes Zanazanyan - football player
 Bahakn Abrahamian - football player
 Dimitra Asilian - water polo player, Olympic silver medalist
 Stefanos Stefanou - track athlete
 Avraam Kalfin - football player
 Daniil Danelian - soccer player
 Grigoris Aganian - soccer player
 Sargis Petrosyan - mixed marshal arts athlete

Writers
 Petros Markaris - writer
 Nora Nadjarian - Cypriot poet

Other
 Athanasios Axarlian - terrorism victim
 Alexis Grigoropoulos - demonstration victim

See also
 Armenians in Greece
 List of Armenians

References
 Armenians of Greece

Lists of Armenian people
 
Armenians
Armenian